Belorusskaya is a station on the Moscow Metro's Koltsevaya line. It is named after the nearby Belorussky Rail Terminal. It opened in 1952, serving briefly as the terminus of the line before the circle was completed in 1954. Designed by Ivan Taranov, Z. Abramova, A. Markova, and Ya. Tatarzhinskaya, the station has low, white marble pylons, an elaborately patterned plaster ceiling, light fixtures supported by ornate scroll-shaped brackets, and a variety of decorations based on Belarusian themes.

Overhead, twelve octagonal mosaics by G. Opryshko, S. Volkov, and I. Morozov depict Belarusian daily life, and underfoot the platform is intricately tiled to resemble a Belarusian quilt. A sculptural group by sculptor Matvey Manizer called "Soviet Belorussia" used to stand at the end of the platform before it was removed in 1998 to make room for a second entrance. Another sculptural group, "Belarusian Partisans," by S.M. Orlov, S. M. Rabinovich, and I. A. Slonim, is located in the passage between this station and Belorusskaya–Radialnaya.

The station's original vestibule is located at the southwest corner of Belorusskaya Square. A newer entrance opens onto Butirsky Val Street.

In 2002, a bomb exploded under one of Belorusskaya's marble benches, injuring seven people.

Transfers
From this station passengers can transfer to Belorusskaya on the Zamoskvoretskaya line, whose metro entrance in closest to Aeroexpress, direct train to Sheremetevo Airport.

References

Moscow Metro stations
Railway stations in Russia opened in 1952
Koltsevaya Line
Railway stations located underground in Russia
Cultural heritage monuments of regional significance in Moscow